Validabad or Walidabad may refer to:
 Validabad, Fars
 Validabad, Markazi